Doug Chiang (born 16 February 1962) is an American film designer and artist. He currently serves as vice president and executive creative director of Lucasfilm.

Early life
Chiang was born in Taipei, Taiwan. His dad had gone to Michigan in the United States for college, and moved the family to Dearborn, Michigan when Chiang was 5 years old. His parents encouraged him to assimilate into American culture by speaking more English, which Chiang described as one of the ways the family tried to fit in. Chiang therefore lost his ability to speak Chinese over the years. Nonetheless, he characterized his lifestyle as "still very culturally Chinese", citing the strong work ethic imposed by his parents.

Chiang was inspired by the original Star Wars film and the accompanying art design book. He studied industrial design at the College for Creative Studies until 1982. He later studied film production at UCLA and graduated in 1986. During his time in college, he was an illustrator and art director for the Daily Bruin and involved with the Association of Chinese Americans.

Career 
During the late 1980s, he worked at various production studios including Rhythm and Hues. Chiang eventually joined Industrial Light & Magic as a creative director where he worked on films such as Terminator 2: Judgment Day (1991) and Forrest Gump (1994). In 1995, he was hired to lead Lucasfilm's art department; he was the design director for Star Wars: Episode I – The Phantom Menace (1999) and Episode II – Attack of the Clones (2002). Afterwards, he was a production designer on Robert Zemeckis' The Polar Express. Outside of film, he collaborated with author Orson Scott Card on an illustrated science-fiction book called Robota.

He founded DC Studios in 2000 with his creation, Robota, as a primary project. Along with Sparx Animation Studios in Ho Chi Minh City, he created several animated shorts depicting the world of Robota in action.

In 2004, Chiang co-founded Ice Blink Studios and worked for Zemeckis on Beowulf. Ice Blink closed in 2007, becoming the core of the facility for ImageMovers Digital, a pioneering performance capture animation studio.

Chiang returned to the Star Wars franchise as the concept artist for The Force Awakens as well as production designer for Rogue One. His other Star Wars includes the films Solo and The Rise of Skywalker, and the television series The Mandalorian.

Awards
Chiang has won numerous awards throughout his career, including an Academy Award and a BAFTA for Death Becomes Her, a BAFTA for Forrest Gump, a FOCUS Award for his independent film Mental Block, a Clio Award for his work on a Malaysian Airlines commercial and The BrandLaureate Award.

Works

Films
 Ghost (1990) (visual effects art director: ILM)
 The Doors (1991) (visual effects art director: ILM)
 Switch (1991) (visual effects art director)
 Terminator 2: Judgment Day (1992) (visual effects art director: ILM)
 Death Becomes Her (1992) (visual effects art director: ILM)
 Forrest Gump (1994) (visual effects art director: ILM)
 The Mask (1994) (visual effects art direction supervisor)
 Jumanji (1995) (visual effects art director: ILM)
 Star Wars: Episode I – The Phantom Menace (1999) (design director, visual effects production designer: ILM)
 Star Wars: Episode II – Attack of the Clones (2002) (concept design supervisor)
 The Polar Express (2004) (production designer)
 War of the Worlds (2005) (concept artist)
 Monster House (2006) (concept design supervisor)
 Beowulf (2007) (production designer)
 A Christmas Carol (2009) (production designer)
 Mars Needs Moms (2011) (production designer)
 Star Wars: The Force Awakens (2015) (concept artist)
 Rogue One: A Star Wars Story (2016) (production designer)
 Solo: A Star Wars Story (2018) (head of design)
 Star Wars: The Rise of Skywalker (2019) (head of design)

Television
 The Mandalorian (2019–present) (design supervisor, art director)
 Obi-Wan Kenobi (2022) (design supervisor)

Books
 Robota (2003) (co-Writer, illustrator) 
 Mechanika: Creating the Art of Science Fiction with Doug Chiang (2008, 2015) (writer, illustrator)
 Star Wars Art: Concepts (Star Wars Art Series) (2013) (introduction, concept artist) 
 The Art of Star Wars: The Force Awakens (2015) (concept artist)

Video games
 Card Soldier Wars (2008) (artist)
 The Looking Glass Wars Card Game (2009) (artist)

See also
Taiwanese art

References

External links
 
 
 Doug Chiang Studio
 Ice Blink Studios

1962 births
Living people
American production designers
American speculative fiction artists
Best Visual Effects Academy Award winners
Best Visual Effects BAFTA Award winners
College for Creative Studies alumni
Lucasfilm people
People from Yilan County, Taiwan
Taiwanese emigrants to the United States
UCLA Film School alumni